Siphonophora is a genus of millipedes belonging to the family Siphonophoridae.

The genus has almost cosmopolitan distribution.

Species:

Siphonophora albiceps 
Siphonophora alveata 
Siphonophora andecola 
Siphonophora atopa 
Siphonophora aviceps 
Siphonophora barberi 
Siphonophora brevicornis 
Siphonophora coatochira 
Siphonophora coclensis 
Siphonophora coctensis 
Siphonophora columbianum 
Siphonophora compacta 
Siphonophora coniceps 
Siphonophora conicornis 
Siphonophora cornuta 
Siphonophora costaricae 
Siphonophora cubana 
Siphonophora duschman 
Siphonophora duse 
Siphonophora dux 
Siphonophora fallens 
Siphonophora feae 
Siphonophora felix 
Siphonophora festae 
Siphonophora filiformis 
Siphonophora flaviceps 
Siphonophora graciliceps 
Siphonophora gracilior 
Siphonophora guianana 
Siphonophora hartii 
Siphonophora hebetunguis 
Siphonophora hoffmani 
Siphonophora humberti 
Siphonophora lafloridae 
Siphonophora larwoodi 
Siphonophora limitare 
Siphonophora lineata 
Siphonophora longirostris 
Siphonophora loriae 
Siphonophora luteola 
Siphonophora luzoniensis 
Siphonophora manni 
Siphonophora margaritafera 
Siphonophora margaritifera 
Siphonophora media 
Siphonophora meinerti 
Siphonophora millepeda 
Siphonophora minuta 
Siphonophora modiglianii 
Siphonophora montana 
Siphonophora monzonica 
Siphonophora nansoriana 
Siphonophora nigrosignata 
Siphonophora obscurior 
Siphonophora panamensis 
Siphonophora parvula 
Siphonophora paulista 
Siphonophora paulistus 
Siphonophora platops 
Siphonophora porcullae 
Siphonophora portoricensis 
Siphonophora progressor 
Siphonophora proxima 
Siphonophora pubescens 
Siphonophora relicta 
Siphonophora robusta 
Siphonophora rosacea 
Siphonophora sabachana 
Siphonophora scolopacina 
Siphonophora senaria 
Siphonophora setaepromissa 
Siphonophora silhouettensis 
Siphonophora spinosa 
Siphonophora taenioides 
Siphonophora takashimai 
Siphonophora telana 
Siphonophora tenuicornis 
Siphonophora texascolens 
Siphonophora tobagoana 
Siphonophora trifini 
Siphonophora tuberculata 
Siphonophora velezi 
Siphonophora vera 
Siphonophora vinosa 
Siphonophora virescens 
Siphonophora zelandica

References

Siphonophorida
Millipede genera